Ekramul Haque Titu (born 1 August 1976) is a Bangladeshi Politician, and Current City Mayor Of Mymensingh. He was elected the first Mayor of Mymensingh City Corporation.

Early life and education 
Titu was born on 6 June 1976 in Mymensingh District. He studied in Mymensingh Zilla School and Ananda Mohan College.  He graduated from Ananda Mohan College.

Career 
He previously worked as Mayor in Mymensingh Municipality. In 2019 he was elected uncontested as the mayor of Mymensingh City Corporation. His rival Jahangir Ahmed, candidate of Jatiya Party, withdrew his candidacy from the election so that he was elected unopposed. He is the vice president of Mymensingh unit of Awami League.

References

Living people
People from Mymensingh District
1976 births
Awami League politicians
Mayors of Mymensingh